Lake Tharthar (also Therthar), and known in Iraq as Buhayrat ath-Tharthar, is an artificial lake created in 1956, situated 100 kilometers (62 mi) northwest of Baghdad between the Tigris and the Euphrates rivers.

History
In 1956, the southern part of the Tharthar depression was turned into an artificial reservoir to collect floodwaters of the Tigris River. The water flows via an artificial inlet canal, named Tharthar Canal. The canal diverts the excess water, by means of a regulator Samarra Barrage. It merges with the lake in its southeastern bank.

The lake has an artificial outlet called Taksim Tharthar Canal, which drains to the Euphrates River directly. The canal, after 28 km (17.4 mi) from its outlet, bifurcates to another canal called "Dhira'a Dijla" (arm of tigris) that returns water back to the Tigris River.
 
Lake Tharthar was the site of a raid in 2005 against an insurgent training base in the region.

Description
The Tharthar depression was formed during the Holocene age, mainly by karstification, due to dissolving of gypsum rocks of the Fatha (nearby area) Formation. The maximum length and width of the depression are 120 and 48 km, respectively.

The main purpose of the Tharthar Lake is to collect excess water of the Tigris River during flood seasons and to recharge water to the Tigris and Euphrates Rivers during dry seasons, when there is shortage of water in both rivers. Moreover, it aims to wash out the salts from the stored water in the lake by means of natural continuous draining of the stored water.

Flora and fauna
Tharthar lake and the surrounding areas are considered one of the most important grazing areas in Iraq, including the wide wheat and corn fields covering the area.  The area harbors many species of animals and vegetation.

Birds
Tharthar lake is considered the main wintering grounds for many threatened species of migrant birds such as saker falcon, MacQueen's bustard, and sociable lapwing. 54 bird species were seen in Tharthar lake including: pallid harrier, European roller, and black-tailed godwit  (all near threatened) were recorded on passage and the endemic race of hooded crow [Corvus cornix capellanus] was present.

Mammals
Golden jackals have been observed regularly at the site. Striped hyenas  and caracals were reported by local people near the lake edge.

Reptiles
Many species of reptiles have been observed such as Turkish gecko and Egyptian spiny-tailed lizard.

Fish
Ten fish species have been found in the lake including: Aspius vorax, yellowfin barbel, B. luteus, B. sharpeyi, goldfish , Cyprnion kais, common carp, Silurus triostegus, Chondrostoma regium,  and Liza abu.

Plants
Tharthar lake and the surrounding area contains about 38 species of plants. Four main habitat types observed within the Al-Tharthar Lake and Al Dhebaeji Field area:
Inland standing water: aquatic communities – rooted submerged vegetation, characterized by Vallisneria spiralis, Potamogeton crispus and Potamogeton perfoliatus.
Flooded communities: periodically or occasionally flooded land dominated by Cyperus sp., Rumex dentatus, Polygonum argyrocoleon, Polygonum sp. and Bacopa monnieri.
Marsh vegetation:  helophytic vegetation - reedbeds, characterized by Phragmites australis.
Terrestrial vegetation:  desert shrub characterized by Tamarix sp., Alhagi maurorum, Atraplex leucoclada and Cornulaca aucheri.

See also
Lake Habbaniyah
Lake Milh
Lake Qadisiyah
Mosul Dam
List of dams and reservoirs in Iraq
Wildlife of Iraq

References

External links

Geography of Iraq
Tharthar
Extreme points of Earth
Tharthar
Tharthar